Engelberg is the ninth album recorded by Swiss singer Stephan Eicher, released in 1991. It contains songs in French, English and German languages. In France, it provided four successful singles : "Déjeuner en paix" (#2), "Pas d'ami (comme toi)" (#7), "Hemmige" (#27) and "Tu ne me dois rien" (#25). It remains to date the singer's largest commercial success.

Chart performances
In Switzerland, the album started at number four on 23 June 1991, and climbed at number one for five consecutive weeks in August 1991. It totaled 46 weeks on the chart (top 40), 23 of them in the top ten, and earned a double platinum disc.

In France, the album debuted at #37 on 19 July 1991 on the SNEP Albums Chart and had a peak at number two for six weeks, almost three months after its release. It totaled 21 weeks in the top ten and 74 weeks in the top 50. The album eventually achieved 2 x Platinum status.

Track listing
 "Wake Up" (Eicher) – 5:52
 "Pas d'ami (comme toi)" (Philippe Djian, Eicher) – 3:37
 "Move Closer" (Eicher) – 3:14
 "Déjeuner en paix" (Djian, Eicher) – 3:55
 "Easy" (Eicher) – 3:45
 "Hemmige" (Mani Matter) – 3:24
 "Wicked Ways" (Klaudia Schifferle, Eicher) – 5:16
 "I'm So Lonesome I Could Cry" (Hank Williams) – 2:52
 "Es Ist Alles" (Eicher, Schifferle) – 5:17
 "Tu ne me dois rien" (Djian, Eicher) – 3:54
 "Come on Home" (Eicher) – 3:46
 "Djian's Waltz" (Djian, Eicher) – 2:52

Personnel
Stephan Eicher – vocals, guitar, piano, slide guitar
Dominique Blanc-Franchard – 12-string guitar
Steve Bolton – guitar
Simon Clark – piano, Hammond organ, synthesizer
Manu Katche – drums
Pino Palladino – bass
Max Lässer – guitar, mandolin
Arnaud Méthivier – accordion
Daniel Affolter – background vocals
Beckie Bell – background vocals
Philippe Djiian – background vocals
Yvone Jones – background vocals
Véronique Rivière – background vocals
Thierry Lecompte – background vocals
Biat Marthaler – viola
Regina Jauslin – cello
Florence Charlin – violin
Julian Fels – violin
Johanna Kern – violin
Mathieu Monneret – cello
Stéphane Rapetti – viola
Isabelle Reynaud – violin
Rudolf Sutter – violin
Thomas Walpen – viola
Christa Zahner – violin
Roland Schildknecht - dulcimer

Production notes
Dominique Blanc-Franchard – producer, engineer, mixing
Martin Hess – executive producer
Sophie Masson – engineer, mixing
Thierry Lecompte – assistant engineer
Jim Rakete – cover photo
Claudine Doury – cover photo
Eric Clermontet – production coordination
Joseph Baldasarre – vocal producer (English lyrics)

Charts and sales

References

1991 albums
Stephan Eicher albums